The women's 78 kg competition at the 2021 European Judo Championships was held on 18 April at the Altice Arena.

Results

Final

Repechage

Top half

Bottom half

References

External links
 

W78
European Judo Championships Women's Half Heavyweight
European W78